Improvisations to Music is the first comedy album by Nichols and May. It was released on December 15, 1958, by Mercury Records.

The sketches were recorded improvised along with the accompaniment of Marty Rubenstein on piano. The album peaked at 39 on the Billboard 200.

Track listing
Cocktail Piano (4:37)	
Mysterioso (4:38)
Second Piano Concerto (The Dentist) (4:57)	
Everybody's Doing It Now (2:40)
Bach to Bach (5:28)
Tango (2:28)	
Sonata for Piano and Celeste (5:37)	
Chopin (3:42)

Influence 
In Netflix's comedy special Jerry Before Seinfeld, Jerry Seinfeld shows his personal collection of standup albums which include Nichols and May's Improvisations to Music

References

1958 debut albums
Nichols and May albums
Mercury Records albums
1950s comedy albums